How We Are Hungry is a collection of short stories by Dave Eggers, originally published by McSweeney's in 2004. The hardcover first edition includes the following pieces:

Stories
"Another"
"What It Means When a Crowd in a Faraway Nation Takes a Soldier Representing Your Own Nation, Shoots Him, Drags Him from His Vehicle and Then Mutilates Him in the Dust," originally published in The Guardian
"The Only Meaning of the Oil-wet Water," originally published in Zoetrope All-Story
"On Wanting to Have Three Walls up Before She Gets Home," originally published in The Guardian
"Climbing to the Window, Pretending to Dance," originally published in The New Yorker in a slightly different form as "Measuring the Jump"
"She Waits, Seething, Blooming," originally published in The Guardian
"Quiet"
"Your Mother and I," originally published in h2s04
"Naveed," originally published in The Guardian
"Notes for a Story of a Man Who Will Not Die Alone," originally published in another form in Ninth Letter
"About the Man Who Began Flying After Meeting Her," originally published in The Guardian
"Up the Mountain Coming Down Slowly," originally published in McSweeney's #10
"There Are Some Things He Should Keep to Himself"
"When They Learned to Yelp"
"After I Was Thrown in the River and Before I Drowned," originally published in Speaking with the Angel

Publication details
"There Are Some Things He Should Keep to Himself," which consists solely of five blank pages, is not included in the paperback edition.

Footnotes

2004 short story collections
American short story collections
McSweeney's books
Works originally published in Timothy McSweeney's Quarterly Concern
Short story collections by Dave Eggers